Maillé may refer to the following places in France:

 Maillé, Indre-et-Loire, a commune in the Indre-et-Loire department, site of a 1944 war crime
 Maillé, Vendée, a commune in the Vendée department
 Maillé, Vienne, a commune in the Vienne department

See also
 Maille (disambiguation)